Jiebo Luo (born 1967) is a Chinese-American computer scientist, Professor of Computer Science at the University of Rochester and Distinguished Researcher with Goergen Institute for Data Science. He is interested in artificial intelligence, data science and computer vision.

Biography
Luo was born in 1967 in Yunnan, China. He obtained his undergraduate degree (1989) and master degree (1992) from University of Science and Technology of China, and PhD degree (1996) from University of Rochester, all in Electrical Engineering. Luo joined the Computer Science Department at University of Rochester in Fall 2011 after over fifteen prolific years at Kodak Research Laboratories, where he last held the position of Senior Principal Scientist.

Luo has been actively involved in numerous technical conferences, including serving as General Chair of 2007 SPIE VCIP, 2008 ACM CIVR and 2018 ACM Multimedia, Program Chair of 2010 ACM Multimedia, 2012 IEEE CVPR, 2016 ACM ICMR and 2017 IEEE ICIP, as well as Area Chair or Senior PC of CVPR, ICCV, ECCV, KDD, AAAI, IJCAI, ACM Multimedia, MICCAI, ICDM, ICWSM, ICPR, ICIP, ICME and ICASSP. He has served as the Editor-in-Chief of the IEEE Transactions on Multimedia, and on the editorial boards of the IEEE Transactions on Pattern Analysis and Machine Intelligence (TPAMI), IEEE Transactions on Multimedia (TMM), IEEE Transactions on Circuits and Systems for Video Technology (TCSVT), IEEE Transactions on Big Data (TBD), ACM Transactions on Intelligent Systems and Technology (TIST), Pattern Recognition (PR), Knowledge and Information Systems (KAIS), Machine Vision and Applications (MVA), and Journal of Electronic Imaging (JEI). He was a guest editor for many special issues, including "Image Understanding for Digital Photos" (PR 2005), "Real-World Image Annotation and Retrieval" (TPAMI 2008), "Event Analysis in Video" (TCSVT 2008), "Integration of Content and Context for Multimedia Management" (TMM 2009), "Probabilistic Graphic Models in Computer Vision" (TPAMI 2009), "Knowledge Discovery over Community-Contributed Multimedia Data" (IEEE MultiMedia 2010), "Social Media" (ACM TOMM 2011), "Social Media as Sensors" (TMM 2013), "Deep Learning in Multimedia Computing" (TMM 2015), "Video Analytics with Deep Learning" (PR 2020), "Learning with Fewer Labels in Computer Vision" (TPAMI, 2021), and so on.

Selected works

Luo's broad research spans image processing, computer vision, natural language processing, machine learning, data mining, social media, biomedical informatics, and ubiquitous computing. He is a pioneer of contextual inference in semantic understanding of visual data and social multimedia data mining. He has published extensively in these fields with nearly 600 peer-reviewed technical papers and over 90 US patents. His h-Index is 112. Some of his notable works are listed below and details can be seen on his website at University of Rochester.

Books 

 2022. Deep Network Design for Medical Image Computing: Principles and Applications (Elsevier), 
 2011. Social Media Modeling and Computing (Springer), 
 2011. Interactive Co-segmentation of Objects in Image Collections (Springer Briefs in Computer Science), 
 2011. Computer Vision (USTC Press), 
 2010. Multimedia Interaction and Intelligent User Interfaces (Springer Advances in Computer Vision and Pattern Recognition),

Articles 

 2021. Best Long Paper, North American Chapter of the Association for Computational Linguistics (NAACL)
2018. Best Industrial Related Paper, International Conference on Pattern Recognition (ICPR)
 2014.  IEEE MultiMedia Prize Paper, IEEE Transactions on Multimedia (TMM)
 2010. Best Student Paper, IEEE Conference on Computer Vision and Pattern Recognition (CVPR)

Patents 

 https://patents.justia.com/inventor/jiebo-luo

Awards and honors
 2004. George Eastman Innovation Award (Kodak's most prestigious technology prize)

 "For contributions to the market-leading Kodak digital radiography systems.

2008. SPIE Fellow

"For achievements in visual communication and electronic imaging."

 2009. IEEE Fellow

 "For contributions to semantic image understanding and intelligent image processing."
 2010. IAPR Fellow
 "For contributions to contextual inference in semantic understanding of images and video."

2018. IEEE Region 1 Technological Innovation in Academic Award

"For contributions in computer vision and data mining."

 2018. AAAI Fellow
"For significant contributions to the fields of computer vision and data mining, and particularly pioneering work on multimodal understanding for sentiment analysis, computational social science, and digital health."
2018. ACM Fellow
 "For contributions to multimedia content analysis and social multimedia informatics."
2021. ACM SIGMM Technical Achievement Award for Outstanding Technical Contributions to Multimedia Computing, Communications and Applications
 "For outstanding, pioneering and continued research contributions in the areas of multimedia content analysis and social media analytics and for outstanding and continued service to the multimedia community."
 2022. Member of Academia Europaea 
  2022. NAI Fellow 
 "For having demonstrated a highly prolific spirit of innovation in creating or facilitating outstanding inventions that have made a tangible impact on the quality of life, economic development, and welfare of society."''

References

External links
 Jiebo Luo's homepage on Rochester
 

1967 births
Living people
Computer scientists
University of Science and Technology of China alumni
University of Rochester alumni